James Wallace Langham II (born March 11, 1965) is an American actor. He is best known for playing the role of Phil the Head Writer on The Larry Sanders Show. He has also played the roles of David Hodges on the crime drama television series CSI: Crime Scene Investigation and its sequel, CSI: Vegas and NASA Administrator Harold Weisner in the Apple TV+ original science fiction space drama series For All Mankind.

Film career
Formerly billed as Wally Ward, Langham got his start in the John Hughes film Weird Science (1985), as well as in The Invisible Kid and the ABC Afterschool Special entitled Just a Regular Kid: An AIDS Story, but later moved to roles as a young bigot in Soul Man and as a gang leader in The Chocolate War. He appeared in the Eddie Murphy comedy Daddy Day Care, and the critically acclaimed Little Miss Sunshine and The Social Network.

Television career
Langham dropped the Ward moniker in the 1990s as he moved to more adult roles, appearing as a regular in the much-hyped but short-lived CBS series WIOU. His big breakthrough came when he was cast as Phil, the cynical staff and then head writer for insecure talk show host Larry Sanders, in HBO's sitcom The Larry Sanders Show. Langham then took on a role in NBC's Veronica's Closet, playing Kirstie Alley's gay assistant Josh. He then appeared on the Joan Cusack sitcom What About Joan?

He has guest-starred on many series including, Murphy Brown, NewsRadio, ER, Murder, She Wrote, Sex and the City, 21 Jump Street, Medium, both the 1985 and the 2002 versions of The Twilight Zone, The Outer Limits, Star Trek: Voyager, Curb Your Enthusiasm, Monk, Shameless (US), and Grace Under Fire.

He was the voice of Andy French on the animated series Mission Hill, as well as the Care-Bots and Smoltz in Buzz Lightyear of Star Command, Basil Karlo/Clayface II in The Batman, Orm/Ocean Master in Batman: The Brave and the Bold, and Anarky in Beware the Batman.

Langham played lab technician David Hodges on the CBS series CSI: Crime Scene Investigation. Starting with the eighth-season premiere, Langham was listed in the main titles.

Other work
Langham plays Dr. Grant Seeker in the preshow of the theme park attraction Dinosaur at Walt Disney World's Animal Kingdom, in which his character attempts to send guests back in time to retrieve a live Iguanadon; his voice is also heard in the ride vehicle throughout the attraction.

Personal life
Langham was born in Fort Worth, Texas, the son of Sunni, a costume designer, and James Langham, an elevator repairman.

In March 2000, Langham pleaded no contest to battery charges after beating a gay tabloid reporter (who had allegedly made accusations against Langham's girlfriend's tattoos; the reporter in turn claimed that Langham yelled homophobic slurs at him while he was being beaten) and was ordered to serve three years' probation and to serve 450 hours of community service for gay and lesbian charities, and to donate $10,000 to the Los Angeles Gay and Lesbian Center. In exchange for pleading no contest, prosecutors dropped a hate crime charge that had been filed against him. In a statement, Langham said he supports gay rights "and would have never attacked anyone had I not first been provoked".

Filmography

Film

Television

References

External links
 

1965 births
Living people
20th-century American male actors
21st-century American male actors
American male film actors
American male television actors
American male voice actors
Male actors from Fort Worth, Texas